The white-eyed robin (Pachycephalopsis poliosoma) is a species of bird in the family Petroicidae.
It is found in Indonesia and Papua New Guinea.

Habitat 
Its natural habitats is subtropical or tropical moist montane forest.

Description 
It is dark grey with a black eye-stripe, a brown tail and a white throat. Its bill is short and its eyes are brown.

References

white-eyed robin
Birds of New Guinea
white-eyed robin
Taxonomy articles created by Polbot